Donny Lalonde vs. Sugar Ray Leonard, billed as For All the Gold, was a professional boxing match contested on November 7, 1988, for Don Lalonde's WBC light heavyweight title and the inaugural WBC super middleweight title.

Background
In August 1988, a fight between reigning WBC light heavyweight champion Donny Lalonde and 3-division champion "Sugar" Ray Leonard was agreed upon. The fight was a rarity in boxing as two titles from different divisions would be on the line; Lalonde's WBC light heavyweight title and the newly created WBC super middleweight title. As such, the two fighters would fight at the 168-pound super middleweight limit. Leonard was ending his third retirement, which he had entered the previous year after defeating Marvin Hagler by a controversial split decision. Leonard and Lalonde agreed to split a $20 million purse with Leonard getting $15 million and Lalonde earning a career-high $5 million. Rather than have an outside promoter, Leonard and Lalonde's teams agreed to co-promote the fight in a joint partnership with the Coors Brewing Company sponsoring the bout. However, there was some controversy prior to the fight when Lalonde refused to wear gear bearing the Coors logo nor participate in promotion for the company. Coors had guaranteed an additional $1 million in each fighters purse and Leonard's lawyer and adviser Mike Trainer threatened to withhold the Coors money from Lalonde, stating "Their money is going to go to a charity of Donny's choice. He's not getting it." He also called the joint-partnership a "nightmare" due in part to problems with Lalonde's manager Dave Wolf.

Prior to the fight, Leonard and his long-time trainer Angelo Dundee, whom had been with Leonard his entire professional career, parted ways. Dundee had taken exception to only receiving $150,000 from the $12 million purse Leonard received for his previous fight against Hagler. Dundee demanded a contract to train Leonard for the Lalonde fight, but Mike Trainer refused, resulting in the split.

The fight
Lalonde controlled the early portion of the fight as a sluggish Leonard had trouble establishing any offense from rounds one through four as Lalonde used his height and reach advantage. In round four Lalonde scored a knockdown after hitting Leonard with a right cross to the head. Leonard was able to continue, but Lalonde quickly went on the attack, throwing punches wildly and opening a cut near Leonard's left eye, though he was able to survive the round. From round five on, Leonard bounced back offensively and the two fighters traded power punches and combinations throughout. In round nine, Lalonde started aggressively but Leonard backed Lalonde into the ropes and landed a flurry of punches ending with a left hook that sent Lalonde down. A clearly dazed Lalonde was able to get back up and continue, but Leonard quickly sent him down again with two right hands followed by a left. Lalonde was unable to get up and Leonard was declared the winner by technical knock out at 2:30 of round nine.

|  style="width:34%; text-align:center;"| Preceded byW12 Marvelous Marvin Hagler
|  style="width:32%; text-align:center;"| Sugar Ray Leonard's boutsNovember 7, 1987
|  style="width:34%; text-align:center;"| Succeeded by D12 Thomas Herans
|-
|  style="width:34%; text-align:center;"| Preceded byKO5 Leslie Stewart
|  style="width:32%; text-align:center;"| Donny Lalonde's boutsNovember 7, 1987
|  style="width:34%; text-align:center;"| Succeeded byKO3 Darryl Fromm

Fight card

References

1988 in boxing
Boxing in Las Vegas
Boxing on HBO
Lalonde
Caesars Palace
November 1988 sports events in the United States